Toni Wilhelm (born 5 February 1983) is a German competitive windsurfer. He was born in Lörrach. He competed in windsurfing at the 2004 Summer Olympics in Athens and at the 2012 Summer Olympics in London, where he finished in 4th place. At the 2016 Summer Olympics in Rio de Janeiro, he finished in 6th place.

References

1983 births
Living people
People from Lörrach
Sportspeople from Freiburg (region)
German windsurfers
Olympic sailors of Germany
German male sailors (sport)
Sailors at the 2004 Summer Olympics – Mistral One Design
Sailors at the 2012 Summer Olympics – RS:X
Sailors at the 2016 Summer Olympics – RS:X
Universiade medalists in sailing
Universiade bronze medalists for Germany
Medalists at the 2005 Summer Universiade